Kaleb Ramot Ramot Gemilang (born 30 May 1991), is an Indonesian professional basketball player.  He currently plays for the Dewa United Surabaya club of the Indonesian Basketball League.

During his time with the CLS Knights, he was part of the Indonesian Basketball League Championship team of 2016.

He has been a member of Indonesia's national basketball team at several occasions.

Career Statistics

NBL/IBL

Regular season

Playoffs

ABL

Regular season

References

External links
 Indonesian Basketball League profile
 Asia-basket.com profile
 NBL Indonesia profile

Videos
 Kaleb Ramot 21Pts/2Reb vs. Bogor Siliwangi | December 7, 2018 Video on youtube.com

1991 births
Living people
Competitors at the 2013 Southeast Asian Games
Competitors at the 2019 Southeast Asian Games
Indonesian men's basketball players
Small forwards
Sportspeople from Bandung
Basketball players at the 2018 Asian Games
Asian Games competitors for Indonesia
Southeast Asian Games competitors for Indonesia